May 2015

See also

References

 05
May 2015 events in the United States